Mark López Mendieta is an American taekwondo practitioner. Mark represented the United States in the 2008 Summer Olympics in Beijing, China. He advanced to the men's -68 kg Gold Medal Match where he lost to Korea's Tae-Jin Son on a last second hit, giving him the silver medal.
Along with his brother Steven and his sister Diana, he won a gold medal at the 2005 World Taekwondo Championships.

He is the younger brother of Olympic gold medalist Steven López and their Taekwondo coach Jean Lopez and older brother of Olympian Diana López and is married to Dagmar López.

Career highlights

2015 Argentina Open (Feather) Gold 
2015 Pan Am Open (Feather) Silver
2015 Mexico Open (Feather): Silver 
2015 Luxor Open (Feather): Silver
2014 Pan Am Open (Feather): Gold 
2014 Mexico Open (Feather): Bronze
2014 Grand Prix Manchester (Feather): Bronze 
2014 Grand Prix Astana (Feather):Silver
2014 Santo Domingo Open (Feather): Gold
2014 Dutch Open (Feather): Bronze
2014 US Open (Feather): Silver
2012 Pan Am Championships (light):Silver
2009  World Championships Denmark: BRONZE
2008  Olympic Games(Feather): Silver
2008  Olympic Trials (Feather): GOLD
2007  Pan Am Olympic Qualifier: SILVER
2007  Olympic Trials (Bantam/Feather): GOLD
2006  Dutch Open (Light): GOLD
2005  World Championships (Feather): GOLD
2003  World Championships (Feather): SILVER
2002  World University Championships (Feather): SILVER
2002  National Collegiate Championships (Feather): GOLD
2002  NCTA Male Athlete of the Year
2001  U.S. National Championships (Feather): GOLD
2001  National Collegiate Championships (Feather): GOLD
2000  U.S. Olympic Qualifying Tournament #1 (Fly): GOLD
2000  National Collegiate Championships (Feather): GOLD
1999  U.S. National Championships (Bantam): BRONZE
1999  World Championships (Bantam): BRONZE
1999  U.S. Junior Olympic Championships (Light): BRONZE
1998  U.S. Open (Fin): SILVER
1998  U.S. National Championships (Fin): BRONZE
1998  World Junior Championships (Feather): BRONZE
1997  U.S. Open (Junior Fly): GOLD
1996  U.S. Open (Junior Super Fin): GOLD

References

External links
Mark Lopez US Olympic Team Profile

American male taekwondo practitioners
Living people
Taekwondo practitioners at the 2008 Summer Olympics
Olympic silver medalists for the United States in taekwondo
Sportspeople from Texas
American people of Nicaraguan descent
Medalists at the 2008 Summer Olympics
American sportsmen
Year of birth missing (living people)
World Taekwondo Championships medalists
21st-century American people